The knockout stage of the 1954 FIFA World Cup was the second and final stage of the competition, following the group stage. The knockout stage began on 26 June with the quarter-finals and ended on 4 July 1954 with the final match, held at the Wankdorf Stadium in Bern. The top two teams from each group (eight in total) advanced to the knockout stage to compete in a single-elimination style tournament. A third place play-off also was played between the two losing teams of the semi-finals.

West Germany won the final 3–2 against Hungary for their first World Cup title.

All times listed are local time.

Qualified teams
The top two placed teams from each of the four groups qualified for the knockout stage.

Bracket

For each of the first two quarter-finals, one team progressing from group 1 was drawn against one team progressing from group 2. For the remaining two quarter-finals, this procedure was repeated for groups 3 and 4.  

For the semi-finals, a further draw was held, with each semi-final featuring one team from groups 1–2 against one team from groups 3–4.

Quarter-finals

Austria vs Switzerland

|valign="top" width="50%"|

|}

Uruguay vs England

West Germany vs Yugoslavia

Hungary vs Brazil

|
|  style="vertical-align:top; width:50%;"|

|}

Semi-finals

West Germany vs Austria

Hungary vs Uruguay

Third place play-off

Final

References

Bibliography

External links
 1954 FIFA World Cup archive

1954 FIFA World Cup
1954
Switzerland at the 1954 FIFA World Cup
Brazil at the 1954 FIFA World Cup
England at the 1954 FIFA World Cup
West Germany at the 1954 FIFA World Cup
Yugoslavia at the 1954 FIFA World Cup
Hungary at the 1954 FIFA World Cup
Austria at the 1954 FIFA World Cup
Uruguay at the 1954 FIFA World Cup